River View House is a historic home located at Cornwall in Orange County, New York. It was built between 1850 and 1860 and is a two-story, five bay frame dwelling.  It features a center projecting bay and refined Italianate / Carpenter Gothic style details.  Also on the property is a cottage.

It was listed on the National Register of Historic Places in 1982.

References

Houses on the National Register of Historic Places in New York (state)
Carpenter Gothic houses in New York (state)
Italianate architecture in New York (state)
Houses completed in 1860
Houses in Orange County, New York
National Register of Historic Places in Orange County, New York